Meet the Russians is a 2013 British reality show produced by Fox about wealthy Russians and Russian speakers who live in London, England. It premiered on 25 September 2013. It was directed by Emma Walsh. According to The New York Times, the show focuses on "newly-arrived, ambitious Russians who had yet to fully assimilate into British society."

Cast

References

External links 
 IMDB page

2013 British television series debuts
2013 British television series endings
2010s British reality television series
2010s British television miniseries
English-language television shows